is a 2005 Japanese horror film directed by Yoshihiro Nakamura and starring Ryuta Sato. The Booth was released on DVD, in the United States, May 23, 2006, distributed by the Tartan Video under their label Tartan Asian Extreme.

References

External links
 The Booth at Rotten Tomatoes
 

2005 films
Japanese horror films
2005 horror films
Films directed by Yoshihiro Nakamura
Fiction about curses
2000s Japanese films